The Boeing Everett Factory is an airplane assembly facility built by Boeing in Everett, Washington, United States. The entire complex spans both sides of State Route 526 (named the Boeing Freeway). The factory was built in 1967 for the Boeing 747 and has since been expanded several times to accommodate new airliners, including the 767, 777, and 787 programs.

History and operations  
Boeing has had a presence in Everett since 1943. In 1966, plans for a factory in the area for the construction of the 747 were first announced after Boeing was awarded a contract worth US$525 million (equivalent to $ million in ) from Pan American World Airways to build 25 of the aircraft. The factory was officially opened on May 1, 1967, four months after the first workers had arrived to start construction of the 747.

Boeing began offering factory tours with the first rollout of the 747 in 1968. As of 2020 over 150,000 people come each year to visit the factory, which employs over 30,000 people and has its own fire department, security team, daycare center, coffee shop, and fitness center. The factory also houses a Boeing Employees' Credit Union branch and several cafés. Across the airport to the west is The Boeing Store, a theater, and the Future of Flight Aviation Center, which runs the factory tour. The Boeing Everett campus is big enough to contain Disneyland with  left over for parking.

To accommodate the Dreamlifter, a converted 747-400 which delivered 787 sections to the plant, a base was constructed on the western edge of Paine Field's runway. Opening in October 2013, the  base, called the Dreamlifter Operations Center, was funded by Snohomish County with $35 million in bonds; it is owned by the county via the airport, with Boeing leasing the site and servicing the bonds.

Current production aircraft

Boeing 767

The Boeing 767 is a mid- to large-size, long-range wide-body twin-engine jet airliner. Production of this plane began in 1979.

These are the 767 variants currently in production:

 767-300F (Freighter)
 KC-46 Pegasus

Boeing 777

The Boeing 777 is a large-size, long-range wide-body twin-engine jet airliner. Production of this plane began in 1993.

These are the 777 variants currently in production:

 777-300ER (Extended Range)
 777F (Freighter)
 777-8
 777-9

Boeing 737 MAX

In late January 2023, Boeing announced that a fourth production line for their Boeing 737 MAX would open at the Boeing Everett Factory, the first not produced at the Boeing Renton Factory. The line will replace the discontinued Boeing 787 line at the factory.

Former production aircraft

Boeing 747

The Boeing 747 is a large-size, long-range wide-body four-engine jet airliner. The Boeing 747 was one of the first wide-body aircraft to be produced and was the first jet to use a wide-body configuration for carrying passengers. Because of the vast size of the 747, the Boeing Everett Factory was designed and built to accommodate the assembly of these large planes as there was not enough room at the Boeing facilities in Seattle. Production of this aircraft began in 1967 and continued until 2022, with the last 747-8F (N863GT) rolling out in December for customer Atlas Air.

Boeing 787

The Boeing 787 Dreamliner is a mid-size, long-range wide-body twin-engine jet airliner. Production of this plane began in 2006.

In February 2011, Boeing announced that some 787 work was being moved to a plant in North Charleston, South Carolina in order to relieve overcrowding of 787s at Everett caused by large volumes of 787 orders. In July 2014, Boeing announced that the 787-10 variant, the longest variant of the 787, would be produced exclusively in South Carolina as the fuselage pieces for that variant are too large for the Dreamlifter to fit for transport to Everett.

Undertaking drastic cost-cutting measures in the wake of the COVID-19 pandemic and its resulting impact on aviation, Boeing announced in July 2020 that it would consider consolidating all of its 787 assembly in a single location; the company chose to move all production to South Carolina on October 1, causing backlash from the Washington state government. The move was completed in February 2021; it was cemented with Boeing's agreement to transfer its lease of the Dreamlifter Operations Center to package courier FedEx in April 2021. FedEx, which takes over the lease on November 1, plans to use it for its cargo airline operations.

The two 787 variants formerly produced in Everett were the 787-8 and the 787-9.

Airport
Aircraft are delivered as a whole from the Paine Field Snohomish County Airport, adjacent to and south of the plant.

See also

 Boeing Renton Factory
 Future of Flight Aviation Center & Boeing Tour

References

External links

 

1967 establishments in Washington (state)
Boeing manufacturing facilities
Boeing
Buildings and structures completed in 1967
Buildings and structures in Everett, Washington
Industrial buildings and structures in Washington (state)
Manufacturing plants in the United States
Manufacturing plants
Manufacturing
Manufacturing buildings and structures
Tourist attractions in Everett, Washington